In mathematics, the Loewner differential equation, or Loewner equation, is an ordinary differential equation discovered by Charles Loewner in 1923 in complex analysis and geometric function theory. Originally introduced for studying slit mappings (conformal mappings of the open disk onto the complex plane with a curve joining 0 to ∞ removed), Loewner's method was later developed in 1943 by the Russian mathematician Pavel Parfenevich Kufarev (1909–1968). Any family of domains in the complex plane that expands continuously in the sense of Carathéodory to the whole plane leads to a one parameter family of conformal mappings, called a Loewner chain, as well as a two parameter family of holomorphic univalent self-mappings of the unit disk, called a Loewner semigroup. This semigroup corresponds to a time dependent holomorphic vector field on the disk given by a one parameter family of holomorphic functions on the disk with positive real part. The Loewner semigroup generalizes the notion of a univalent semigroup.

The Loewner differential equation has led to inequalities for univalent functions that played an important role in the solution of the Bieberbach conjecture by Louis de Branges in 1985. Loewner himself used his techniques in 1923 for proving the conjecture for the third coefficient. The Schramm–Loewner equation, a stochastic generalization of the Loewner differential equation discovered by Oded Schramm in the late 1990s, has been extensively developed in probability theory and conformal field theory.

Subordinate univalent functions

 is said to be subordinate to  if and only if there is a univalent mapping  of  into itself fixing  such that

A necessary and sufficient condition for the existence of such a mapping  is that

Necessity is immediate.

Conversely  must be defined by

and

Loewner chain
For  let  be a family of open connected and simply connected subsets of  containing , such that

if ,

and

Thus if ,

in the sense of the Carathéodory kernel theorem.

given by the Riemann mapping theorem are uniformly continuous on compact subsets

Moreover, the function  is positive, continuous, strictly increasing and continuous.

By a reparametrization it can be assumed that

Hence

The univalent mappings  are called a Loewner chain.

The Koebe distortion theorem shows that knowledge of the chain is equivalent to the properties of the open sets .

Loewner semigroup
If  is a Loewner chain, then

for  so that there is a unique univalent self mapping of the disk  fixing  such that

By uniqueness the mappings  have the following semigroup property:

They constitute a Loewner semigroup.

Loewner differential equation
The Loewner differential equation can be derived either for the Loewner semigroup or equivalently for the Loewner chain.

For the semigroup, let

then

with

Then  satisfies the ordinary differential equation

with initial condition .

To obtain the differential equation satisfied by the Loewner chain  note that

 
so that  satisfies the differential equation

with initial condition

The Picard–Lindelöf theorem for ordinary differential equations guarantees that these

The Loewner chain can be recovered from the Loewner semigroup by passing to the limit:

 such that

there is a Loewner chain  such that

They follow in general by replacing mappings  by approximations
 and then using a standard compactness argument.

Slit mappings
Herglotz representation theorem:

where  is a probability measure on the circle. Taking a point measure singles out functions

Inequalities for univalent functions on the unit disk can be proved by using the density for uniform convergence on compact subsets of slit mappings. These are conformal maps of the unit disk onto the complex plane with a Jordan arc connecting a finite point to ∞ omitted. Density follows by applying the Carathéodory kernel theorem. In fact any univalent function  is approximated by functions

which take the unit circle onto an analytic curve. A point on that curve can be connected to infinity by a Jordan arc. The regions obtained by omitting a small segment of the analytic curve to one side of the chosen point converge to  so the corresponding univalent maps of  onto these regions converge to  uniformly on compact sets.

To apply the Loewner differential equation to a slit function , the omitted Jordan arc  from a finite point to  can be parametrized by  so that the map univalent map  of  onto  less 
 has the form

with  continuous. In particular

For , let

with  continuous.

This gives a Loewner chain and Loewner semigroup with

To determine , note that  maps the unit disk into the unit disk with a Jordan arc from an interior point to the boundary removed. 
 to the unit circle.  is the complex conjugate (or inverse) of :

Not every continuous function  comes from a slit mapping, but Kufarev showed this was true when  has a continuous derivative.

Application to Bieberbach conjecture
 used his differential equation for slit mappings to prove the Bieberbach conjecture

for the third coefficient of a univalent function

In this case, rotating if necessary, it can be assumed that  is non-negative.

Then

with  continuous. They satisfy

If

the Loewner differential equation implies

and

So

which immediately implies Bieberbach's inequality

Similarly

using the Cauchy–Schwarz inequality.

Notes

References

Complex analysis